Oskar Rieding (29 June 1846 in Banie, Pomerania, now Poland–7 July 1916 in Celje, Austria-Hungary, now Slovenia) was a German violinist, teacher of music, and composer.

Oskar Rieding attended first the recently founded  in Berlin, and later the Leipzig Conservatory. At the end of the 1860s he moved to Vienna, but in 1871 the conductor Hans Richter, at that time Musical Director of the National Theatre in Budapest, appointed Rieding to the orchestra's first violin section. He remained there for thirty-two years, from 1884 onwards in the National Opera House. He composed some violin concertos and many pieces for violin and piano. Many of these pieces are appropriate for intermediate-level violin students, and they are still studied and performed by violin students today. After his retirement in 1903, he lived in Celje, continuing his activities as teacher, composer, and performer, until his death in 1916.

Main works
His better-known works include:
Concerto in B minor for Violin and Piano Op. 35 (1909)
Concerto in D major for Violin and Piano Op. 36
Concertino in G for Violin and Piano Op. 24
Gypsies' March Op. 23 No. 2, for Violin and Piano
Concertino in A Minor for Violin and Piano in Hungarian style Op. 21
Rondo

External links

 

"Oskar [Oscar] Rieding, musicalics.com

References

1846 births
1916 deaths
19th-century classical composers
20th-century classical composers
Composers for violin
German classical violinists
Male classical violinists
German violinists
German male violinists
German Romantic composers
German male classical composers
20th-century German composers
19th-century German composers
20th-century German male musicians
19th-century German male musicians